Paúles de Sarsa is a locality located in the municipality of Aínsa-Sobrarbe, in Huesca province, Aragon, Spain. As of 2020, it has a population of 19.

Geography 
Paúles de Sarsa is located 91km east-northeast of Huesca.

References

Populated places in the Province of Huesca